Pierre Cathala (1888 – 1947) was a French politician. He served as the French Minister of Finance from 1942 to 1944.

Early life
Pierre Cathala was born on 22 September 1888 in Montfort-sur-Meu, Brittany, France. He was educated at the Lycée Saint-Louis, and in Bayonne where he became friends with Pierre Laval.

Career
Cathala served as the French Minister of Finance from 1942 to 1944.

Personal life
Cathala married Mathilde Henriette Lagrange. They had two sons, François and Jean-Claude, and a daughter, Renée.

Death
Cathala died on 27 July 1947 in Paris, France.

References

External links
 

1888 births
1947 deaths
People from Ille-et-Vilaine
Politicians from Brittany
Radical Party (France) politicians
Social and Radical Left politicians
Independent Radical politicians
French Ministers of Finance
Government ministers of France
Members of the 14th Chamber of Deputies of the French Third Republic
Members of the 15th Chamber of Deputies of the French Third Republic
People of Vichy France
French military personnel of World War I
Recipients of the Croix de Guerre 1914–1918 (France)